Nathan Ballingrud (born December 31, 1970) is an American writer of horror and dark fantasy fiction. His novella, The Visible Filth, was adapted into a feature film titled Wounds by Babak Anvari. The film is distributed by Annapurna Pictures, premiering on the Sundance Film Festival on January 26, 2019.

Awards 
Ballingrud's stories have received critical acclaim and were nominated for multiple awards.

 In 2007, "The Monsters of Heaven" won the Shirley Jackson Award for Best Short Story
 In 2013, North-American Lake Monsters won the Shirley Jackson Award for Best Single-Author Short Story Collection
 In 2013, North-American Lake Monsters was nominated for the Bram Stoker Award for Superior Achievement in a Fiction Collection
 In 2014, North-American Lake Monsters was shortlisted for the World Fantasy Award for Best Collection
 In 2014, North-American Lake Monsters was shortlisted for the British Fantasy Award for best Collection

Bibliography

Books 
 North American Lake Monsters (2013)
 The Visible Filth (2015)
 Wounds: Six Stories from the Border of Hell (2019)

References

External links

1970 births
Living people
University of New Orleans alumni
University of North Carolina alumni
American horror writers
21st-century American writers
Weird fiction writers
American male short story writers